The Wingham Tigers are a Rugby League Club from Wingham, New South Wales that participates in Group 3 Rugby League competitions.

Playing Record
Playing record compiled from the club history book and scores published in the Rugby League Week.

References

Sources
 Rugby League Week at State Library of NSW Research and Collections
 Blood, Sweat and Beers : A History of the Wingham District Rugby League Football Club, Graham Steel, 2005, No ISBN.

Rugby league teams in New South Wales
Mid North Coast